ALBC may refer to:

Abraham Lincoln Bicentennial Commission
American Livestock Breeds Conservancy